"A Hard Rain's a-Gonna Fall" is a song written by American musician and Nobel Laureate Bob Dylan in the summer of 1962 and recorded later that year for his second album, The Freewheelin' Bob Dylan (1963). Its lyrical structure is modeled after the question and answer form of traditional ballads such as "Lord Randall".

The song is characterized by symbolist imagery in the style of Arthur Rimbaud, communicating suffering, pollution, and warfare. Dylan has said that all of the lyrics were taken from the initial lines of songs that "he thought he would never have time to write." Nat Hentoff quoted Dylan as saying that he immediately wrote the song in response to the Cuban Missile Crisis, although in his memoir, Chronicles: Volume One, Dylan attributed his inspiration to the feeling he got when reading microfiche newspapers in the New York Public Library: "After a while you become aware of nothing but a culture of feeling, of black days, of schism, evil for evil, the common destiny of the human being getting thrown off course. It’s all one long funeral song."

History
Dylan originally wrote "A Hard Rain's a-Gonna Fall" in the form of a poem. The first iteration of the lyrics was written on a typewriter in the shared apartment of Dylan's friends Wavy Gravy and singer Tom Paxton, within Greenwich Village, New York City. Significant edits occurred after this time, for instance, an earlier draft which appeared in both Sing Out and Broadside folk magazines contained "a highway of golden with nobody on it" rather than the final lyric "a highway of diamonds".

On September 22, 1962, Dylan appeared for the first time at Carnegie Hall as part of an all-star hootenanny. His three-song set marked the first public performance of "A Hard Rain's a-Gonna Fall," a complex and powerful song built upon the question-and-answer refrain pattern of the traditional British ballad "Lord Randall", published by Francis Child.

One month later, on October 22, U.S. President John F. Kennedy appeared on national television to announce the discovery of Soviet missiles on the island of Cuba, initiating the Cuban Missile Crisis. In the sleeve notes on the Freewheelin''' album, Nat Hentoff would quote Dylan as saying that he wrote "A Hard Rain" in response to the Cuban Missile Crisis: "Every line in it is actually the start of a whole new song. But when I wrote it, I thought I wouldn't have enough time alive to write all those songs so I put all I could into this one." In actuality, Dylan had written the song more than a month before the crisis broke.

The song was recorded in a single take at Columbia Records' Studio A on December 6, 1962.

Analysis and reception
Folk singer Pete Seeger interpreted the line "Where the home in the valley meets the damp dirty prison" as referring to when a young person suddenly wants to leave his home but then qualified that by saying, "People are wrong when they say 'I know what he means.'"

While some have suggested that the refrain of the song refers to nuclear fallout, Dylan disputed that this was a specific reference. In a radio interview with Studs Terkel in 1963, Dylan said: No, it's not atomic rain, it's just a hard rain. It isn't the fallout rain. I mean some sort of end that's just gotta happen ... In the last verse, when I say, "the pellets of poison are flooding the waters," that means all the lies that people get told on their radios and in their newspapers.In No Direction Home, Martin Scorsese's documentary on Dylan, the Beat poet Allen Ginsberg talked about the first time he heard Dylan's music: When I got back from India, and got to the West Coast, there's a poet, Charlie Plymell - at a party in Bolinas — played me a record of this new young folk singer. And I heard "Hard Rain," I think. And wept. 'Cause it seemed that the torch had been passed to another generation. From earlier bohemian, or Beat illumination. And self-empowerment.

Author Ian MacDonald described the song as one of the most idiosyncratic protest songs ever written.

Live performance

Although Dylan may have first played the song to friends, "A Hard Rain's a-Gonna Fall" was formally premiered at Carnegie Hall on September 22, 1962, as part of a hootenanny organized by Pete Seeger.  Seeger recalled: "I had to announce to all the singers, 'Folks, you're gonna be limited to three songs. No more. 'Cause we each have ten minutes apiece.' And Bob raised his hand and said, 'What am I supposed to do? One of my songs is ten minutes long.'"

Dylan featured the song regularly in concerts in the years since he premiered it, and there have been several dramatic performances.  An October 1963 performance at Carnegie Hall was released on The Bootleg Series Vol. 7: No Direction Home, while another New York City performance, recorded one year later, appeared on The Bootleg Series Vol. 6: Bob Dylan Live 1964, Concert at Philharmonic Hall.  Dylan performed the song in August 1971 at The Concert for Bangla Desh, organized by George Harrison and Ravi Shankar, for East Pakistan refugee relief (now independent Bangladesh) after the 1970 Bhola cyclone and during the 1971 Bangladesh Liberation War.  On December 4, 1975, at the Forum de Montréal, Canada, Dylan recorded an upbeat version of the song, which appeared on The Bootleg Series Vol. 5: Bob Dylan Live 1975, The Rolling Thunder Revue.  That rendition was featured in the 2019 Netflix documentary Rolling Thunder Revue: A Bob Dylan Story by Martin Scorsese, and it also appears on the box set The Rolling Thunder Revue: The 1975 Live Recordings, along with a November 21, 1975 performance and a still earlier rehearsal.  On May 23, 1994, Dylan performed the song at "The Great Music Experience" festival in Japan, backed by a 90-piece symphony orchestra conducted by Michael Kamen.  At the end of 2007, Dylan recorded a new version of "A Hard Rain's a-Gonna Fall"  exclusively for the Expo 2008 Zaragoza world fair, scheduled to open on June 8, 2008, to highlight the Expo theme of "water and sustainable development". As well as choosing local-band Amaral to record a version of the song in Spanish, Dylan's new version ended with a few spoken words about his "being proud to be a part of the mission to make water safe and clean for every human being living in this world."

Patti Smith performed the song with orchestral accompaniment at the Nobel Prize Award Ceremony on December 10, 2016, to commemorate Dylan receiving the Nobel Prize in Literature.

Covers

Pete Seeger: We Shall Overcome (Pete Seeger album) (1963); World of Pete Seeger (1973); We Shall Overcome: Complete Carnegie Hall Concert (1989); The Best of Broadside 1962–1988 (2000)
Joan Baez: Farewell Angelina (1965); The First 10 Years (1970); Live -Europe '83: Children of the Eighties (1983); Rare, Live & Classic (1993)
Rod MacKinnon: Folk Concert Down Under (1965)
Leon Russell: 1971 single release, from Leon Russell and the Shelter People 
Bryan Ferry: the single from These Foolish Things (1973) reached number 10 in the UK Singles Chart in September 1973 and appeared on compilation albums  Street Life: 20 Great Hits (1986) and More Than This: The Best of Bryan Ferry (1999)
The Staple Singers:  What the World Needs Now (1968);Use What You Got (1973)
Lee Yun Sil: In Korean translation as “Sonatbi” (“Shower”, 1973)
Nana Mouskouri: Le ciel est noir - Nana Mouskouri au Théâtre des Champs-Élysées (1974 live release); À Paris (1979 live release); Le Ciel est Noir - Les 50 Plus Belles Chansons de Nana Mouskouri (2007 release); Rendez-Vous (2011 release, recorded as a duet with Canadian singer Garou).
Edie Brickell and New Bohemians: Born on the Fourth of July (soundtrack) (1989)
Barbara Dickson: Don't Think Twice, It's Alright (1992)
Melanie: Silence Is King (1993)
Hanne Boel Misty Paradise album release 1994
Arthur Brown performs the song on his 2002 CD Live in BristolMugison Covered this song as the opening of his aldrei for ég suður concert 2008
Aviv Geffen Geshem Kaved Omed Lipol (in Hebrew: גשם כבד עומד ליפול)
Andy Hill: It Takes a Lot to Laugh (2000)
Guitarist Bill Frisell plays an instrumental version on his live release "East/West" (2005)
Jason Mraz: Listen to Bob Dylan: A Tribute (2005)
Faust: "Nodutgang" (compilation) (2006)
Ann Wilson (lead singer of Heart): Hope & Glory (2007 solo release) (with Rufus Wainwright & Shawn Colvin)
Les Fradkin covered it as part of his 2007 release "12"
Robert Křesťan: Dylanovky (2007)
Amaral made a Spanish version for EXPO Zaragoza 2008 called Llegará la tormenta (The storm will arrive)
The Dead performed a live version at the Verizon Center in Washington, D.C. on April 14, 2009.
Furthur performed the song at concerts in California and Massachusetts during their 2010 tour.
Robert Plant & The Band Of Joy at an April 8, 2011, show in Louisville, KY.
Ernst Jansz have translated the song in Dutch: Zware regen. From his CD Dromen van Johanna (Visions of Johanna)
Jimmy Cliff: Sacred Fire EP (2011)
Walk Off the Earth: A Hard Rain's a Gonna Fall - Marshall and Sarah Blackwood (2011)
Tom Russell with Lucinda Williams and Calexico: Mesabi (2011)
Widespread Panic occasionally performs the song in the arrangement of Leon Russell's version
Jamie Hartman with Rosi Golan: III (2012)
Dead & Company performed the song occasionally on their 2016 summer tour.
Patti Smith performed the song on 2016 Nobel Prize Ceremony.
Laura Marling covered the song for the season four finale of Peaky Blinders.
Kurt Elling: The Questions (2018)
Bob Weir and Phil Lesh performed it on their Bobby and Phil DuoTour at Radio City Music Hall, New York City, March 2, 2018
Jack DeJohnette included the song in his 2017 album HudsonEliza Gilkyson: 2020 (2020)
Gian Pieretti in his album '' Nobel '', dedicated to songs by Bob Dylan in Italian, with the title ''Una forte pioggia cadrà''

Other media
Photographer Mark Edwards took a series of photographs illustrating the lyrics of the song which were exhibited in many locations such as the United Nations headquarters.  These were published in a book in 2006. The song is also mentioned prominently at the end of Haruki Murakami's novel Hard-Boiled Wonderland and the End of the World''.

See also
List of Bob Dylan songs based on earlier tunes

Notes

References

External links
Lyrics at Bob Dylan's official website

1963 songs
Bob Dylan songs
Edie Brickell & New Bohemians songs
Joan Baez songs
List songs
Pete Seeger songs
Song recordings produced by John Hammond (record producer)
Songs written by Bob Dylan